The Epitymbiini are a tribe of tortrix moths.

Genera
Aeolostoma
Anisogona
Aplastoceros
Apoctena
Asthenoptycha
Capnoptycha
Cleptacaca
Epitymbia
Goboea
Macrothyma
Meritastis
Mimeoclysia
Pandurista
Polydrachma
Rhomboceros
Sperchia
Trychnophylla

References 

 
Moth tribes